Bleşteni is a commune in Edineţ district, Moldova. It is composed of two villages, Bleşteni and Volodeni. Bleşteni is the smaller of the two.

Notable people 
Riorita Paterău, member of parliament

References

Communes of Edineț District